You're Speaking My Language is the first full-length album by Juliette and the Licks, released on May 17, 2005.

Track listing
 "Intro" - 0:23
 "You're Speaking My Language" - 2:14
 "Money in My Pocket" - 3:08
 "American Boy, Vol. 2" - 3:47
 "I Never Got to Tell You What I Wanted To" - 4:33
 "This I Know" - 3:57
 "Pray for the Band Latoya" - 2:49
 "So Amazing" - 2:19
 "By the Heat of Your Light" - 2:56
 "Got Love to Kill (Remix)" - 3:42
 "Seventh Sign" - 3:57
 "Long Road Out of Here" - 6:39
 "Shelter Your Needs" (Bonus track, only on Japanese release)
 "Get Your Tongue Wet" (Bonus track, only on Japanese release)

Produced by Juliette and the Licks.
© 2005 Lake Enterprises under exclusive licence to Hassle Records.

Single track listing

You're Speaking My Language (single)
 "You're Speaking My Language"
 "Hey You, Hey Man (B-Side)"
 "Get Your Tongue Wet (B-Side)"

You're Speaking My Language (DVD single)
 "You're Speaking My Language (Audio)"
 "You're Speaking My Language (Video)"
 "You're Speaking My Language (Video Outtakes)"
 "You're Speaking My Language (Lyrics Sheet)"

Got Love to Kill (single)
 "Got Love To Kill"
 "I Never Got To Tell You What I Wanted To (XFM Radio Session)"
 "Got Love To Kill (Virgin Radio Session)"
 "Got Love To Kill (Remix)" Enhanced Video

Personnel
Juliette Lewis - vocals, design, layout design
Todd Morse - guitarist
Kemble Walters - guitarist
Paul Ill - bass guitarist
Jason Morris - drummer
Jason Harris - engineer
Jasmine Chang - administration
Juliette and the Licks - producer
Buck Snow - engineer, mixing assistant
Jaymz Todd - design, layout design
Shannon Turgeon - photo stylist
Steve Churchyard - mixing
Bernie Grundman - mastering

References

External links
Official website
Official MySpace

2005 debut albums
Juliette and the Licks albums
Hassle Records albums